The first season of the military science fiction television series Stargate SG-1 commenced airing on the Showtime channel in the United States on July 27, 1997, concluded on the Sci Fi channel on March 6, 1998, and contained 22 episodes. The show itself is a spin-off from the 1994 hit movie Stargate written by Dean Devlin and Roland Emmerich. Stargate SG-1 re-introduced supporting characters from the film universe, such as Jonathan "Jack" O'Neill and Daniel Jackson and included new characters such as Teal'c, George Hammond and Samantha "Sam" Carter. The first season was about a military-science expedition team discovering how to use the ancient device, named the Stargate, to explore the galaxy. However, they encountered a powerful enemy in the film named the Goa'uld, who are bent on destroying Earth and all who oppose them.

Ratings success 
The 100-minute premiere "Children of the Gods", which aired on July 27, 1997 at 8 p.m, received Showtime's highest-ever ratings for a series premiere and ranked as the highest-rated original movie to premiere on Showtime at the time. The show got a 10.5 rating in Showtime's approximately 12 million U.S. households, which equaled approximately 1.5 million homes in total. Season one regular cast members included Richard Dean Anderson, Amanda Tapping, Michael Shanks, Christopher Judge and Don S. Davis.

The series was a ratings success for Showtime. Although it received little critical response from major media publishers, Stargate SG-1 was honored with numerous awards and award nominations in its first-season run. What was originally planned to be a two season long series lasted for ten seasons and became the second longest-running science fiction series of all time after the original series of Doctor Who (1963–1989).

Development

Production 
Brad Wright and Jonathan Glassner had worked together on the Metro–Goldwyn–Mayer (MGM) television series The Outer Limits since 1995. Wright saw a wide range of possible science fiction storylines in the original Stargate (1994) film that could take place in the present day. Meanwhile, Glassner was interested in the feature film's theme that Ancient Egypt had been partially or completely built by aliens. Upon hearing of MGM's plan to create a television spin-off series of the film, Wright and Glassner independently and unbeknownst to each other approached MGM and proposed their concept for the television series. MGM president John Symes greenlit the project on the condition that Wright and Glassner worked together as executive producers of the new show. The show was
eventually given the name Stargate SG-1 after Wright flightily agreed to Symes's pitch question if the team should be called "SG-1". MGM released posters titled Stargate SG-1 within the next week without the knowledge of Wright and Glassner.

John Symes approached Michael Greenburg and Richard Dean Anderson of MacGyver fame. Although Anderson was never a real fan of the science fiction genre, he believed the original concept of a "Stargate" was a good vehicle for a series. Anderson agreed to become involved with the project if his character Jack O'Neill was allowed significantly more comedic leeway than Kurt Russell's character in the feature film. He also requested Stargate SG-1 to be more of an ensemble show, so that he would not be carrying the plot alone as on MacGyver. The American subscription channel Showtime made a two-season commitment for 44 episodes in 1996. Principal photography began in Vancouver in February 1997.

"The First Commandment" was the first Stargate SG-1 episode written by Robert C. Cooper, who would later become an executive producer and co-creator of the spin-off series Stargate Atlantis. Paul McGillion, who played young Ernest Littlefield in "Torment of Tantalus", would go on to play the recurring and later main character Dr. Carson Beckett in Stargate Atlantis. The outside scenes of "Solitudes" were filmed at Pemberton Icefield. The rest of the episode was filmed in the studio, which was filled with fake snow and ice and kept at a low temperature.

Production design 
Lead production designer Richard Hudolin flew to Los Angeles, 1996 to gather material from Stargate for reference and found the original film prop stored outside in the Californian desert. Although the prop had severely disintegrated, he could take a detailed mould for Stargate SG-1 production to build its own prop. The new Stargate was engineered to turn, lock the chevrons, and be computer-controlled to dial specific gate addresses. A portable Stargate prop was built for on-location shoots and required six workers and one full day to set up. Since visual effects are sometimes faster and cheaper, a computer-generated Stargate was occasionally used in on-location shoots in later seasons.

The design of the Stargate Command (SGC) base was supposed to match the real Cheyenne Mountain complex as much as possible. The set had to be twice as high for shooting as the 22 feet tall Stargate prop, but one of Hudolin's original plans of a three-level SGC set was rejected in favor of a two-level set. The gateroom was the biggest room on set and could be redesigned for other scenes. Two multi-purpose rooms were frequently redecorated into the infirmary, Daniel's lab, the cafeteria or the gym. The SGC set and all other sets from the pilot episode were constructed within six weeks in January and February 1997, incorporating some original set pieces from the feature film.

Cast and characters 
The initial season had five main characters getting star billing. Richard Dean Anderson portrayed formerly suicidal United States Air Force Colonel Jonathan "Jack" O'Neill. Michael Shanks played the American Egyptologist Daniel Jackson. Both O'Neill and Jackson appeared in the 1994 film Stargate. Amanda Tapping played astrophysicist and United States Air Force captain Samantha "Sam" Carter. Christopher Judge portrayed Teal'c, a Jaffa from Chulak and former First Prime of Apophis. Don S. Davis played George Hammond, the new leader of the Stargate program, taking over after General W.O. West. Numerous supporting characters have been given expansive and recurring appearances in the progressive storyline, including: Teryl Rothery as Janet Fraiser, Gary Jones as Chevron Guy (later identified as Walter Harriman), Jay Acovone as Charles Kawalsky (portrayed by John Diehl in the 1994 feature film), Tom McBeath as Harry Maybourne, and Ronny Cox as Robert Kinsey, among others.

Main cast

 Starring Richard Dean Anderson as Colonel Jack O'Neill
 Michael Shanks as Dr. Daniel Jackson
 Amanda Tapping as Captain Samantha Carter
 With Christopher Judge as Teal'c
 And Don S. Davis as Major General George Hammond

Release and reception 

The original airing of "Children of the Gods" on Showtime featured full frontal nudity during the scene showing the possession of Sha're (Vaitiare Bandera) by Amonet. While this has never been repeated on network television and subsequent airings as well as this episode available on most streaming platforms have had the nudity cut out for syndication; it was rated  R by the MPAA. The DVD, iTunes and Netflix prints of this episode retain this scene. According to Brad Wright, the Showtime network had insisted on the full frontal nudity despite Wright's vocal opposition; Wright told fan site GateWorld that he would cut the nudity scene from the 2009 direct-to-DVD recut of the pilot episode. The DVD version, in fact, only retains a portion of this scene, with full frontal nudity being cut and a partial syndicate friendly back nudity version used.  Likely because of the nudity, the original version of this episode as well as the next two episodes of the series are the first and only ones in the series to be rated by the MPAA (it is rated R), while in the UK the episode is rated 18 by the BBFC (all other episodes have generally been rated PG, or 12, very occasionally 15). It is rated M in Australia, recommended for (but not restricted to) viewers 15 and older. The version available on iTunes and Netflix is the uncut, original version of the episode.

"Hathor" was heavily criticized, and the series' writers themselves acknowledged the episode's weakness. Later, in the Season 7 episode "Heroes (Part 1)", Dr. Fraiser is discussing Jack with the film crew and mentions "the whole Hathor incident, which we were never supposed to speak of again". "Politics", was the series' first clip show, it is widely regarded as one of Stargate SG-1s weakest episodes.

"Children of the Gods" was nominated for a Golden Reel Award in the category "Best Sound Editing – Television Movies of the Week" and the music for "Best Sound Editing – Television Episodic – Music". "The Nox" was nominated for an Emmy in the category "Outstanding Music Composition for a Series (Dramatic Underscore)". "Within the Serpent's Grasp" was nominated for a Gemini Award in the category "Best Visual Effects". Richard Dean Anderson won a Saturn Award for Best Genre TV Actor.

 Cultural references 
During the production of "Solitudes", a joke was played on Richard Dean Anderson. Whilst filming, when O'Neill asks how Carter is getting along with unearthing the Stargate's DHD, Carter starts ranting at O'Neill for being completely "MacUseless" even though he spent seven years on MacGyver, referring to Richard Dean Anderson's role in both shows. The prank was organized by Tapping in cooperation with the director. Similarly, in the first episode, "Children of the Gods" Carter speaks of "MacGyvering" the Stargate into operation while O'Neill rolls his eyes. The 2009 DVD version of this episode does not contain the MacGyver reference. "Politics" contains a scene that references uploading a virus to an alien mothership, alluding that the solution to the movie Independence Day will not work in this situation. "Within the Serpent's Grasp" contains the only scene produced especially for Showtime, not shown on the syndicated versions. When seeing a floating metal ball, Teal'c explains "It is a Goa'uld long-range visual communication device, somewhat like your television, only much further advanced." In the Showtime version, O'Neill says "Think it gets Showtime?" While this scene remains in the DVD versions of the episode, syndication runs have O'Neill instead saying, "Hmm....Goa'uld TV..." (in a manner similar to that of Homer Simpson)

 Episodes 

In the United States the series broadcaster, Showtime, aired episodes 7 through 19, except 14 and 17 out of order.

Episodes in bold' are continuous episodes, where the story spans over 2 or more episodes.

This is the list of episodes in order as they aired on Showtime.

References

External links 

 Season 1  on GateWorld
 Season 1 on IMDb
 

 01
1997 American television seasons
1998 American television seasons
SG-1 01
1997 Canadian television seasons
1998 Canadian television seasons